Bas Verwijlen (born 1 October 1983 in Oss) is a Dutch right-handed épée fencer and four-time Olympian.

He started fencing when he was five years old at fencing club Zaal Verwijlen in Oss, owned by his father Roel Verwijlen, who is also the Dutch national coach. Until he was twelve years old, he fenced in two different weapons, but he has since chosen to focus on the épée. He became part of the Dutch national team and took part in the Universiade (17th in Beijing, 2001), Youth Olympics, Dutch national championships, but also European and World Championships. As a junior, he won eleven national titles, he became third at the World Championships under-16 in the United States and represented the Netherlands at every European and World Championship since 1998. He won two World Cups for Juniors, a performance never achieved by another fencer.

It was time for his senior career and also managed to achieve World class performances there. At the 2005 World Championships in Leipzig he won the bronze medal. At the European Championships 2005 in Zalaegerszeg he and his Dutch teammates came sixth in the nations tournament. He reached the final and became second at the 2006 European Championships in Izmir. After the Grand Prix meeting in Stockholm in 2008 he was secure of qualification for the 2008 Summer Olympics in Beijing. In the preparations for this tournament he won the World Cup meeting in Cali, Colombia in June and he also won the Dutch national title.  At the 2008 Summer Olympics he reached the last eight, losing to the eventual gold medalist, Matteo Tagliariol.

At the 2011 European Championships, he finished in 2nd place, a result he repeated at the 2011 World Championships. He qualified for the 2012 Summer Olympics, finishing in 13th place, despite a knee injury.

Medal Record

World Championship

European Championship

Grand Prix

World Cup

References

1983 births
Living people
Dutch male épée fencers
Fencers at the 2008 Summer Olympics
Fencers at the 2012 Summer Olympics
Fencers at the 2016 Summer Olympics
Olympic fencers of the Netherlands
Sportspeople from Oss
European Games competitors for the Netherlands
Fencers at the 2015 European Games
Fencers at the 2020 Summer Olympics
21st-century Dutch people